Hasse Evert Thomsén (27 February 1942 – 26 April 2004) was a heavyweight boxer from Sweden who won a bronze medal at the 1972 Summer Olympics. In the semifinals he was defeated by Romania's eventual silver medalist Ion Alexe on points (0:5). Thomsén was a national heavyweight champion in 1969–72.

In 1973–74, Thomsén had five professional bouts in Europe with a result of one loss and 4 draws.

References

External links
 
 
 

Heavyweight boxers
Boxers at the 1972 Summer Olympics
Olympic boxers of Sweden
Olympic bronze medalists for Sweden
1942 births
2004 deaths
Place of death missing
Olympic medalists in boxing
Swedish male boxers
Medalists at the 1972 Summer Olympics
Sportspeople from Gothenburg
20th-century Swedish people